The 2002 Brabantse Pijl was the 42nd edition of the Brabantse Pijl cycle race and was held on 27 March 2002. The race started in Zaventem and finished in Alsemberg. The race was won by Fabien De Waele.

General classification

References

2002
Brabantse Pijl